Arthur Preuss (1871–1934) was a German-American journalist, editor and writer. He is noted for editing the Fortnightly Review  and opposing Freemasonry and eugenics. He was a conservative intellectual whose father, Eduard Friedrich Reinhold Preuss, had also edited a Catholic newspaper.

Preuss was a layman in St Louis. His  Fortnightly Review was a major conservative voice in English and read closely by church leaders and intellectuals from 1894 to 1934. He also edited a Catholic newspaper in St. Louis. Intensely loyal to the Vatican. Preuss upheld the  German Catholic community, denounced the heresy of Americanism, promoted the Catholic University of America, and anguished over the anti-German America hysteria during World War I. He provided lengthy commentary regarding the National Catholic Welfare Conference, the anti-Catholic factor in the presidential campaign of 1928, the hardships of the Great Depression, and the liberalism of the New Deal.

Works
Study on American Freemasonry
''A dictionary of secret and other societies. Comprising masonic rites, lodges, and clubs; concordant, clandestine, and spurious masonic bodies, non-masonic freemasons Organizations to Which only are ADMITTED, mystical and occult societies, fraternal, benevolent and beneficiary societies, political, patriotic, and civic brotherhoods; Greek fraternities and sororities letter, military orders and ancestral; revolutionary brotherhoods, and many other Organizations, St. Louis, Mo. / London: B. Herder Book, 1924.Freemasonry And The Human Soul, Kessinger Publishing.Masonic Morality and Benevolence'', Kessinger Publishing.

References

External links
 
 

1871 births
1934 deaths
American male journalists
American editors
Roman Catholic writers
American people of German descent
American anti-communists
Anti-Masonry